The 1986 Munster Senior Hurling Championship Final was a hurling match played on Sunday 20 July 1986 at FitzGerald Stadium, Killarney. It was contested by Cork and Clare. Cork captained by Tom Cashman claimed the title beating Clare on a scoreline of 2-18 to 3-12.

References

External links
Match Programme Cover

Munster
Clare county hurling team matches
Cork county hurling team matches
Munster Senior Hurling Championship Finals